Ruter may refer to:

In companies
 Ruter, Norwegian public transport authority

In people
 Amanda Ruter Dufour (1822 – 1899), American poet; niece of Martin Ruter, sister of Rebecca Ruter Springer
 Gaston Ruter (1898 – 1979), French entomologist
 Martin Ruter (1785 - 1838), American minister, missionary and educator 
 Rebecca Ruter Springer (1832 – 1904), American author; niece of Martin Ruter, sister of Amanda Ruter Dufour

Other uses
 Ruter Hall, historic building on the campus of Allegheny College at Meadville, Pennsylvania, U.S.